Giuseppe Bugatti (born 1 March 1965) is an Italian former racing driver.

References

1965 births
Living people
Italian racing drivers
International Formula 3000 drivers

Karting World Championship drivers
Prema Powerteam drivers